Long Pond is a pond in St. John's, Newfoundland and Labrador, Canada. It is next to Prince Philip Drive (the parkway) near the St. John's Arts and Culture Centre, and the Fluvarium is on the opposite side of the pond. It sports a walking trail around its shore, of which a small percentage is the Prince Philip Drive sidewalk; and a turnoff trail on the Fluvarium side leads to Mount Scio Road.

Landforms of St. John's, Newfoundland and Labrador
Lakes of Newfoundland and Labrador